Downsend School is a co-educational independent school for pupils aged between two and sixteen. In 2020, Downsend became a through-school, offering a three year GCSE. It is located in Leatherhead, Ashtead and Epsom, in Surrey, UK.

It is now a school for boys and girls, and takes on pupils from 6 to 16 years of age. Unusually the school does not have charitable status, being run as a profitable business by Cognita Schools Limited. Downsend's headmaster is Mr Ian Thorpe, previously head of Chinthurst School.

History
Downsend was founded, owned for nearly a century, and headmastered by three generations of the Linford family. A. H. Linford had started Peterborough Lodge, a preparatory school for about 100 boys aged 5 to 15, including 5 to 10 boarders, at 143 Finchley Road, Hampstead, about 1898. During the First World War he opened Downsend for the boarders from Peterborough Lodge, and in 1940 after the beginning of the Second World War the two schools amalgamated at the Downsend site between Leatherhead and Ashtead. A. H. Linford's son Cedric T. Linford became headmaster.

For about a year from 1942 the boarders were taken out of the London area to Hurstpierpoint College in Sussex, where they were under the control of the mathematics master, Denys Straker. C. T. Linford remained headmaster, also teaching Latin and Greek, until his son Christopher J. Linford took over in 1968. The school was run as a non-denominational preparatory school for boys aged 8 to 13. It achieved a good record for scholarships to leading public schools, especially during the long period when Denys Straker was the mathematics master. In 1968 the school had 220 boys; Christopher Linford expanded the business to four schools in the area educating a total of around 900 boys and girls. In 2002 no one in the family was willing to take on the heavy responsibility of running the school and it was sold to Asquith Court Schools Ltd.

The school
Downsend is situated at 1 Leatherhead Road, Leatherhead, Surrey KT22 8TJ, just outside Ashtead. Three Little Downsend Nursery and Pre-preps are located in Epsom, Leatherhead and Ashtead, all surrounding the main site. The structure of the school is as follows: Little Downsend caters for children aged 2 to 6 (First Steps to Year 1), years 2-6 are the Junior School. Pupils then automatically ascend into the Lower Senior School (years 7-8), and then continue into the Upper Senior School (9,10,11).

Facilities
There is a sports hall and an adjacent indoor, heated swimming pool with multiple changing rooms. There are a total of six tennis courts on tarmac surfaces, and a covered area. On 12 May 2007 the local Member of Parliament, Chris Grayling, opened the new Astro Turf. The junior and senior schools are all separate but connected. The junior school has its own hall and library and headmistress. This is the same with the senior school. The school has administration offices and science laboratories. Downsend has several outdoor play areas and a dining hall/theatre. There are design and technology laboratories for woodwork and textiles and 2 STAR (Science, Technology and Art Room). In 2022 Downsend will launch its £5m Creative Arts Centre featuring 198 seat auditorium, black box studio and music rooms. Specialist GCSE teaching will follow later in 2022.

Sport
Downsend has large grass playing fields and an astro-turf one located on site. This was opened to pupils in 2007. The school has several rugby, football, cricket, and rounders pitches. The tarmac area can be converted into tennis courts, netball pitches, basketball courts, or hockey pitches (although hockey is generally on the astro). The sports hall can be used for basketball as it has several hoops and pitches. Badminton can be played in the hall as can gymnastics and volleyball. Inside the hall, there are four cricket nets. The school has sports teams in soccer, rugby, netball, cricket, rounders, basketball, athletics, swimming, and hockey. These teams compete in inter-school matches as well as school games.

The school competes regularly in the National Biathlon Championships, in 2012 held at Crystal Palace and, in 2012, has maintained its record of 7 national titles in a row.

Little Downsend Schools (Epsom, Ashtead and Leatherhead)
The three Little Downsend Schools are located around the main site in the towns of Leatherhead, Ashtead and Epsom. They take children from 2 to 6 years of age and pupils can automatically transfer up to the main school. Little Downsend has its own headmistress and Heads of School.

Notable alumni

 Richard Stanley Leigh Jones (born 1940), Australian parliamentarian.
 John Marrack (naval officer), (10 February 1921 – 7 November 2009) naval officer, Queen's Harbourmaster 1962.
 Dominic Sibley (born 1995), England cricketer.

References

External links 
 

Private schools in Surrey
1891 establishments in England
 
Cognita
Leatherhead